Cilandak (Sundanese: ᮎᮤᮜᮔ᮪ᮓᮊ᮪) is a district of South Jakarta, Indonesia. The Krukut River flows through the eastern edge of Cilandak, while the Pesanggrahan and Grogol Rivers flow through the western edge.  

The southern portion of the Jakarta Outer Ring Road passes through Cilandak district.

History
Historically, sub-districts in Cilandak District were part of the Kebayoran Lama District, Bogor Regency, and Tangerang Regency.

Kelurahan (Urban villages)
The district of Cilandak is divided into five kelurahan or administrative villages:
Cipete Selatan - area code 12410
Gandaria Selatan - area code 12420
Cilandak Barat - area code 12430
Lebak Bulus - area code 12440
Pondok Labu - area code 12450

List of important places
BATAN (Badan Tenaga Atom Nasional or National Atomic Energy Agency) nuclear technology research center (Established in 1966)
Cilandak Town Square shopping mall
Gereja Paroki St. Stefanus or "St. Stephen Parish's Church" (established in 1977)
Pondok Labu Market 
TNI Research and Development Center.
Prambors a commercial radio network

Education

Jakarta Intercultural School, Cilandak campus

Singapore International School Bona Vista - Lebak Bulus

SMAN 66 Jakarta

SMPN 85 Jakarta

Universitas Pembangunan Nasional "Veteran" Jakarta

SMAN 34 Jakarta

References

Districts of Jakarta
South Jakarta